Not related to Ronald 'Bo' Ginn, former U.S. representative from Georgia's 1st congressional district

Charles David Ginn, known as David 'Bo' Ginn Williams (1 August 1927 - 2006),  is a Democrat former member of the Louisiana State Senate from Bastrop, Louisiana. He formerly resided in Tupelo, Mississippi. From 1980 to 1988, Ginn represented Senate District 33, which in the first term encompassed his own Morehouse Parish and Richland, West Carroll, and East Carroll parishes in the northeastern portion of his state.

In the 1979 primary election, Ginn upset Edwards Barham, a one-term Republican and the first member of his party since Reconstruction elected to the Louisiana Senate. Ginn won reelection in 1983, when he defeated fellow Democrat Willie E. Crain, 23,062 (52.5 percent) to 20,865 (47.5 percent). This time, the district included Madison Parish, five precincts from Ouachita Parish, as well as Morehouse, Richland, and East and West Carroll. Ginn did not seek a third term in the 1987 primary, as voters elected Willie Crain to the seat by a large margin.

References

1951 births
Living people
People from Bastrop, Louisiana
Democratic Party Louisiana state senators
Politicians from Tupelo, Mississippi